Indian Creek is a stream in Benton County in the U.S. state of Missouri. It is a tributary of Cole Camp Creek.

Indian Creek was named for the Indians who lived along its course.

See also
List of rivers of Missouri

References

Rivers of Benton County, Missouri
Rivers of Missouri